Laylo Shodieva (born 26 March 2000) is an Uzbekistani footballer who plays as a defender for Women's Championship club Sevinch and the Uzbekistan women's national team.

International career
Shodieva capped for Uzbekistan at senior level during the 2018 CAFA Women's Championship and the 2019 Hope Cup.

See also
List of Uzbekistan women's international footballers

References 

2000 births
Living people
Uzbekistani women's footballers
Uzbekistan women's international footballers
Women's association football defenders
People from Qashqadaryo Region
21st-century Uzbekistani women